The National Live Music Awards of 2016 are the inaugural National Live Music Awards. The event took place on 29 November 2016.

Award director, Larry Heath said: "Artists like Ngaiire are the beating heart of the contemporary live music scene in Australia and to be able to recognise her for that, alongside dozens of other winners around the country, is what these awards were designed for. I look forward to seeing the event evolve and develop in the years to come and continuing to spread our love for live music around the country, solidifying our place both locally and internationally one of the healthiest live music scenes in the world." The awards took place across 8 venues all around Australia, encompassing and representing every State and Territory, making the National Live Music Awards an industry first.

National awards
Nominations and wins below.

Live Act of the Year

Live Voice of the Year

The Heatseeker Award

 The Heatseeker Award recognises a rising star on the Australian live circuit, who have gone from unknown to selling out rooms around the country over the last 12 months.

Live Bassist of the Year

Live Drummer of the Year

Live Guitarist of the Year

Live Instrumentalist of the Year

Live Electronic Act (or DJ) of the Year

Live Hard Rock Act of the Year

Live Hip Hop Act of the Year

Live R&B or Soul Act of the Year

Live Roots Act of the Year

Best Live Music Festival or Event

International Live Achievement (Group)

International Live Achievement (Solo)

Industry Achievement

State and Territory awards
Note: Wins only.

 NT Live Act of the Year was a tie.

References

2016 in Australian music
2016 music awards
National Live Music Awards